Wojciech Szewczyk (Born 1 September 1994) is a Polish professional pool player. 

Szewczyk is a two time junior European Pool Championship winner, winning the 8-ball event in 2010, defeating Finn Eschment in the final,
and the 9-ball event in 2011 defeating Lars Kuckherm in the final. He is also a former Euro Tour event runner-up, losing in the final of the 2012 Austria Open, losing in the final to Nikos Ekonomopoulos 9–4.

Achievements
 World Championships
 WPA World Ten-ball Championship (2022)
 Longoni 9-Ball League - with (Mieszko Fortuński) (2023)
 European Pool Championship 
 10-Ball (2021)
 Polish Pool Championship
 Nine-Ball (2018, 2020, 2021)
 Eight-Ball (2019, 2020)
 Predator Bucharest Open (2018)

References

External links

Polish pool players
Living people
Polish sportsmen
1994 births